The United States census of 1960, conducted by the Census Bureau, determined the resident population of the United States to be 179,323,175, an increase of 19 percent over the 151,325,798 persons enumerated during the 1950 census. This was the first census in which all states recorded a population of over 200,000. This census's data determined the electoral votes for the 1964 and 1968 presidential elections. This was also the last census in which New York was the most populous state.

Data availability
Microdata from the 1960 census are freely available through the Integrated Public Use Microdata Series. Aggregate data for small areas, together with electronic boundary files, can be downloaded from the National Historical Geographic Information System. Personally identifiable information will be available in 2032.

State rankings

City rankings

Notes

External links
 Historical Overview of the 1960 Census (US Census Bureau)
 1961 U.S Census Report Contains 1960 census results

United States Census, 1960
United States census
United States